Anthony "Boom" Labrusca (born December 2, 1976) is a Filipino character actor and model.

Recent career
In October 2010, he started at hosting Usapang Lalake on Studio 23 with Aran Sese, Jobert Austria and Alex Calleja.

Personal life
Labrusca has a son with ex-girlfriend Angel Jones, a member of 1990s hip hop group Kulay, named Anthony "Tony" Labrusca Jr.  (born 1995), who auditioned in Pinoy Boyband Superstar. Tony grew up in Canada with his mother and his stepfather, Boom Dayupay.

Labrusca is married to his Flordeliza co-star Desiree del Valle since January 2018. Del Valle confirmed their engagement on July 14, 2015.

Labrusca is a Catholic.

Filmography

Television

Film

References

External links

1974 births
Living people
Filipino male models
GMA Network personalities
ABS-CBN personalities
Star Magic
21st-century Filipino male actors
Filipino male television actors
Filipino male film actors
Filipino Roman Catholics
20th-century Filipino male actors
Male actors from Manila